"Just One Look" is a song co-written by American R&B singers Doris Troy and Gregory Carroll. The recording by Doris Troy was a hit in 1963. The Hollies, Anne Murray and Linda Ronstadt each achieved great success with the song. There have also been many other versions.

Doris Troy version

Background
Details vary as to how the Doris Troy version came to be released on Atlantic Records.  According to the book Billboard Book of One-Hit Wonders, James Brown saw Troy performing in a nightclub (under her then-stage name Doris Payne), and introduced her to Atlantic. According to a more recent and detailed story in Soulful Divas, Payne recorded a studio demo of the song and took it to Sue Records first, but their lack of response led her to offer it to Jerry Wexler at Atlantic, where the label released the demo unchanged. The personnel included Ernie Hayes on piano, Wally Richardson on guitar, Bob Bushnell on bass and Bernard Purdie on drums.

The single's release was the first time she started using "Doris Troy" as her stage name, though her pen name remained Doris Payne. She is listed as Payne in the songwriting credits.

Reception
In 1963, Doris Troy scored her only hit on the U.S. Billboard Hot 100 chart with "Just One Look". The song spent 14 weeks on the Billboard Hot 100, peaking at No. 10, while reaching No. 3 on Billboards Hot R&B Singles chart, No. 8 on New Zealand's "Lever Hit Parade", and No. 1 on Canada's CHUM Hit Parade. It also charted at No. 9 on the Cash Box Top 100, in a tandem ranking with the version by Andy and the Marglows, with Troy's version marked as a bestseller.

"Just One Look" was ranked No. 70 on Billboards end of year ranking "Top Records of 1963", while being ranked No. 80 on Cash Boxs "Top 100 Chart Hits of 1963", and No. 11 on Billboards "Top R&B Singles for 1963".

Chart performance

Weekly charts

Year-end charts

In television advertisements
Doris Troy's version was featured in a 1991 Pepsi commercial starring Cindy Crawford, which was re-aired during Super Bowl XXXV in 2001. An updated version of the ad, still featuring Cindy Crawford and Troy's rendition aired in 2002. In 2015, Troy's take was featured in an ad for Aspartame Free Diet Pepsi. A different version was utilized in a series of commercials for Mazda, beginning in 1979 and continuing into the early 1980s.

The Hollies version

Background
"Just One Look" became a hit in the United Kingdom via a cover by the Hollies which reached No. 2 on the Record Retailer chart in April 1964. It became the 37th biggest hit of the year.  Although not a major U.S. hit in its original release, the Hollies' "Just One Look" marked the first appearance of the band on the Billboard Hot 100 at No. 98. A U.S. re-issue in 1967 reached No. 44 on the Billboard Hot 100.

Chart performance

Weekly charts

Linda Ronstadt version

Background
Linda Ronstadt included "Just One Look" on her 1978 album Living in the USA. Her cover was issued on Asylum Records as the album's third single on January 23, 1979 and was produced by Peter Asher. Ronstadt's single spent eight weeks on the Billboard Hot 100, reaching No. 44, while reaching No. 5 on Billboards Easy Listening chart. It also peaked at No. 46 on the Cash Box Top 100 and No. 54 on the Record World Singles chart.

Chart performance

Weekly charts

Year-end charts

Other versions
Anne Murray remade "Just One Look" for her 1974 Love Song album. The track was produced by Brian Ahern and issued as a single that October. Her cover reached No. 11 on Canada's RPM Top Singles chart, No. 12 on Canada's CHUM 30, and spent two weeks on the U.S. Billboard Hot 100, reaching No. 86. It also reached No. 50 on Billboards Easy Listening chart. The single's B-side, "Son of a Rotten Gambler", reached No. 1 on RPMs Adult Contemporary chart and No. 3 on RPMs Country chart in 1974.

The Tampa, Florida-based disco band Faith Hope and Charity released a cover, which spent four weeks on the UK Singles Chart, reaching No. 38 on February 7, 1976.

See also
One-hit wonders in the United States
List of 1960s one-hit wonders in the United States

References

External links
 
 
 
 
 
 

1963 singles
1964 singles
1974 singles
Doris Troy songs
The Hollies songs
Linda Ronstadt songs
Faith Hope and Charity (US band) songs
Anne Murray songs
Rhythm and blues songs
1963 songs
Atlantic Records singles
Parlophone singles
Asylum Records singles
1979 singles
Songs written by Gregory Carroll (R&B singer)
Songs written by Doris Troy